Rajpura Kharkari is a village in the Bhiwani district of the Indian state of Haryana. , the village had 233 households with a total population of 1,124 of which 602 were male and 522 female.

References

Villages in Bhiwani district